The Sirène-class submarines were a sub-class of the 600 Series built for the French Navy prior to World War II. There were four vessels in the class, built to a Loire-Simonot design. They were ordered in 1925 and completed by 1927. Three of the four boats of the Sirène class saw action during the Second World War, from September 1939 until the  French armistice in June 1940.

General characteristics
The Sirènes had a displacement of  surfaced and  submerged. Their armament was seven torpedo tubes (3 forward, 2 midships, and 2 aft) with an outfit of 13 torpedoes. As with all French submarines of this period, the midships torpedo tubes were fitted externally in trainable mounts. They had a single  and two 8 mm machine guns, and were manned by crews of 41 men.

Ships
 , scuttled November 1942 Toulon; raised, sunk in air raid June 1944.
 , (Q124) scuttled November 1942 Toulon; raised, sunk in air raid twice; April 1943, November 1943.
 , scuttled November 1942 Toulon; raised, sunk in air raid June 1944.
 , decommissioned in 1938.

See also
 List of submarines of France
 French submarines of World War II

Notes

References

 Bagnasco, E :Submarines of World War Two (1977) 
 Conway : Conway's All the World's Fighting Ships 1922–1946 (1980) 

Submarine classes
 
Ship classes of the French Navy
Sirène-class submarines (1925)